This is a list of Bien de Interés Cultural landmarks in the Province of Álava, Spain.

Basilica of San Prudencio de Armentia
Bridge of Mantible
Cathedral of Santa María de Vitoria
Church of Nuestra Señora de la Asunción (Elvillar) 
Church of Nuestra Señora de la Asunción (Labastida)
Church of Nuestra Señora de la Peña de Faido
Church of San Andrés (El Ciego)
Church of San Juan (Salvatierra)
Church of San Miguel (Vitoria)
Church of San Pedro Apóstol (Vitoria)
Church of San Vicente Mártir (Vitoria)
Church of Santa María (Salvatierra)
Church of Santa María de los Reyes
House of Cordón (Vitoria)
Iruña-Veleia
La chabola de la Hechicera
La Hoya, Alava
Los Arquillos
Nueva Square (Vitoria)
Palace of Augustin
Palace of Lazarraga
Plaza Nueva, Vitoria
Sanctuary of Nuestra Señora de Estíbaliz
Tower-palace of Guevara
Tower of Mendoza
Tower of Villañañe
Walls of Salinillas de Buradon

References 

Alava